Todd McFarlane's Spawn, also known as Spawn: The Animated Series or simply Spawn is an American adult animated superhero television series that aired on HBO from 1997 through 1999 and reran on Cartoon Network's Toonami programming block in Japan. It has also been released on DVD as a film series. The show is based on the Spawn character from Image Comics, and won an Emmy Award in 1999 for Outstanding Animation Program (Longer Than One Hour).

Plot
The series revolves around the story of former Marine Force Recon Lieutenant Colonel Al Simmons, who worked as a government assassin in covert black ops. He was betrayed and killed by a man whom he believed to be his close friend (the man, later to be revealed as Chapel, burned him alive with a flamethrower during a mission). Upon his death, Simmons vowed revenge on Chapel and hoped that he would one day return to his beloved wife Wanda.

Because of his life as an assassin, Simmons' soul goes to Hell. In order to accomplish his vow, he makes a pact with the devil Malebolgia (who was the overlord on the eighth plane of Hell). The pact was a simple one: Simmons would become a soldier in Malebolgia's army (known as a "Hellspawn" or "Spawn" for short) in return for the ability to walk the earth once again in order to see Wanda. However, Simmons was tricked by Malebolgia: his body was not returned to him and he is returned to Earth five years after his death. He had been given a different body which was a festering, pungently cadaverous, maggot-ridden walking corpse that had a massive living red cape attached to it. Because his new body had been rotten for some time and was in an advanced state of decay, his face had become heavily malformed, to the point that he barely appeared human, which led to Simmons donning a mask in order to cover its grotesque appearance.

Upon his return to "life", Spawn seeks out Wanda, who had apparently got over the grief of having lost Al and married another man, Al's best friend Terry Fitzgerald with whom she had had a daughter, Cyan. Terry, a respectable man, works as an analyst for a man named Jason Wynn. Wynn is a powerbroker in the CIA and secretly a black market arms dealer, amongst other things (such as the head of secret government organizations within the NSA and National Security Council). Wynn is revealed to be the man responsible for the death of Al Simmons due to a disagreement that the two had between each other concerning their "work". Jason's actions would also prove dangerous to the lives of Terry, Wanda, and their daughter as well. Realizing that he is no longer the man in Wanda's life, Al swears to protect her and her new family.

The series depicts Spawn nesting in the dark alleyways, killing any who invade his newfound territory. Rejecting these actions as unworthy of Spawn's time and power, Malebolgia then dispatches another of his minions (a demonic creature known as the Violator that assumes the form of a short, obese clown) to try to persuade Spawn to commit acts of violence and savagery in the name of Hell.

Spawn struggles to fight the lure of evil, as well as seeking to escape being hunted by not only the forces of Hell, but by assailants from Heaven, who have a need to destroy the Hellspawns in order to cripple the forces of Hell so that they do not gain an edge in the escalating war between the two spiritual hosts. As the war intensifies, the line between the forces of good and evil become increasingly blurry. Spawn finds help along the way in the form of a disheveled old man named Cogliostro who was once a Hellspawn that overcame the demonic powers resting within, amongst a number of other characters.

In the last episodes of the series, Spawn learns how to shapeshift and, appearing as Terry, makes love to Wanda, impregnating her. It is revealed that there is a prophecy that the child of a Hellspawn will play the deciding factor in Armageddon, and may be the real reason Spawn was allowed to return to Earth.

Episodes

Todd McFarlane's Spawn

Todd McFarlane's Spawn 2

Todd McFarlane's Spawn 3: The Ultimate Battle

Voice cast

Production
Regarding his initial meeting with HBO executives for the project, Todd McFarlane recalled, "I wanted to ask one question . . . can I say the word, "f_-?" If they let me do that, there's 100 other things I could get away with, too." He also remarked in 1997, "People have such a stereotype about animation — they immediately think cartoons and Disney. They're not used to seeing Silence of the Lambs, The Godfather and Seven all in one cartoon, but that's what they're getting." HBO granted the show a six million dollar budget for its first season. It was produced in Los Angeles, although McFarlane lived in Phoenix, Arizona at the time, stating in a 2021 interview, "I was flying into Century City every week while we were doing that, for three years."

The score and opening theme was handled by Shirley Walker, who also composed background music for Batman: The Animated Series. While Batman: The Animated Series featured traditional movie orchestra-type music, the producers of Todd McFarlane's Spawn requested that Walker give the series a more organic and subtle electronic soundtrack, with only minimal usage of orchestral sounds. J. Peter Robinson composed the score for the third and final season.

The series included live action intros by McFarlane. The intros for the first season were shot inside a castle-like location, and feature McFarlane asking rhetorical questions to the viewer, before introducing the episodes. Live action intros continued to be made for the remaining seasons. The intros were included on VHS and DVD releases which packaged the show's episodes individually, but are removed from releases which present the seasons in a singular movie format.

The first season concluded on HBO in late June 1997, a month after it had begun airing. At the beginning of August 1997, a live action Spawn film was released by New Line Cinema. It was noted for having a more mainstream tone than the animated series. Shortly after the release of the film, work on a second season of episodes began, which would begin airing the following year.

On October 31, 1997, St. Louis Blues hockey player Tony Twist filed a successful lawsuit against HBO and Todd McFarlane Productions, after finding out that a mob boss character from the first season was named after him. He stated, "I'm in pink thong underwear, smoking a cigar, ordering the kidnapping of a child while two women are naked on the couch making love to each other. I obviously didn't want any part of that. Even if I was a good guy I wouldn’t have participated. You’ve got kids being kidnapped, you’ve got nudity, you’ve got police raping women. It’s nothing I want to be affiliated with." The Tony Twist character originally appeared in the Spawn comics, but was not included in New Line's live action film.

It ended in 1999 following the conclusion of the third season. A fourth season was originally planned, but never came to fruition. John Leekley who served as the head writer and showrunner for the second and third season revealed that some of the ideas for the scrapped fourth season involved the return of Angela looking to avenge the death of Jade who was her previous lover, several one time characters would've returned and had larger roles, a gang war spiraling out of control led by the ruthless Barrabas, Spawn befriending a runaway teenage girl named Kristen with a case of pyrophobia, a now disfigured Wynn looking for redemption, Chapel breaking out of the asylum and winds up a pawn for Angela, Merrimack having to team up with Twitch to save her daughter, and most of the characters coming to the realization of Spawn's identity.

Reception
Some critics believe that the series was overshadowed by the poorly received film adaptation of Spawn, which also debuted in the summer of 1997. It has achieved a small but loyal cult following who praise the animation, writing, voice acting, music, and dark tone, whereas the graphic violence and intentional unresolved cliffhanger has attracted criticism. Variety stated in 1997 that "It's as dark and complex as anything HBO has attempted in the live-action arena. And visually, it's quite the stunner. HBO wanted different, and it surely got it." A more mixed review at the time came from The Dallas Morning News, they questioned why anyone would "want to subject themselves to such a relentlessly grim, gruesome dehumanizing experience." The Tampa Bay Times remarked that the first three episodes "unfold in a disjointed, abstract style that owes as much to the animated movie Heavy Metal as the Batman trilogy."

NowThis News claimed it was "one of the most shocking shows on TV in the ‘90s" and that it "set a new bar for mature animation." Bloody Disgusting stated in 2018 that it was "still the character's best incarnation", while the Comic Book Herald commented in 2021 that "it almost plays like an adult extrapolation of Batman: The Animated Series". In 2017, CBR praised the show's music, stating "[Shirley] Walker’s work on Spawn takes the gothic elements of her Batman: The Animated Series compositions to an even darker place. The epic heroic themes are gone, replaced with long, low notes and eerie hints of ethereal threats lurking in the distance. Some of the more “adult” elements of the series were dismissed as juvenile attempts at maturity, but the score isn’t one of them. It’s moody beyond belief, the perfect musical companion for the bleakness of the series."

Legacy
Todd McFarlane's Spawn was ranked 5th on IGN's list of "The Greatest Comic Book Cartoons of All Time", and 23rd on IGN's list of "Top 25 Primetime Animated Series of All Time" (despite the fact the show was aired at midnight on HBO). In 2011, Complex ranked it 8th on their 2011 list of "The 25 Most Underrated Animated TV Shows of All Time".

Series producer Eric Radomski reflected in a retrospective interview that "Spawn TAS was a personal triumph for me. Very rarely do artists get the opportunity to have as much uncensored creative freedom as I did at HBO on Spawn."

A sequel series titled Spawn: The Animation was in development in 2004 and was set to be released in 2007 with Keith David reprising his role, but due to McFarlane wanting to push the animation further, the project ended up in production limbo until it was quietly cancelled. Keith David would go on to reprise Spawn as a guest character for Mortal Kombat 11 in 2019.

Home media
All three seasons have been released separately on DVD and VHS as three two-hour movies, under the titles Todd McFarlane's Spawn, Todd McFarlane's Spawn 2, and Todd McFarlane's Spawn 3: The Ultimate Battle.

On July 24, 2007, HBO Video released a 4-disc 10th-anniversary signature collector's edition on DVD with all 18 episodes and multiple bonus features.

When the show's first and second seasons were released on video they were released in two formats. The first format was called the "Uncut Collector's Edition", which is the version that was shown on TV and held a TV-MA rating, and the other was a special edited version called the "Special Edited Edition" which held a PG-13 rating by toning down the violence and sexual content.

The first movie was also released in the UMD format for Sony's PSP handheld video game system, but the other two movies were not.

On July 5, 2016, HBO added all three seasons to its streaming services, HBO GO and HBO NOW. It's also available on HBO Max as of 2021.

See also
 Spawn (character)
 Spawn (film)

References

External links
 
 Todd McFarlane's Spawn at Toon Zone

1990s American adult animated television series
1990s American black cartoons
1990s American horror television series
1997 American television series debuts
1999 American television series endings
American adult animated action television series
American adult animated drama television series
American adult animated fantasy television series
American adult animated horror television series
American adult animated science fiction television series
American adult animated superhero television series
American animated science fantasy television series
American black superhero television shows
Animated thriller television series
Anime-influenced Western animated television series
Dark fantasy television series
Emmy Award-winning programs
English-language television shows
HBO original programming
Religious drama television series
Spawn (comics)
Superhero horror television shows
Television shows based on comics
Television series about demons
Television series based on Image Comics
Television shows set in New York City